Segeltorps IF is a Swedish football club located in Kungens Kurva.

Background
Segeltorps Idrottsföreningen is a sports club in Kungens Kurva in Huddinge Municipality in Metropolitan Stockholm.  The club is well known for its women's ice-hockey team which won the Swedish Championships in 2008, 2010 and 2011.

The men's football team currently plays in Division 4 Stockholm Södra which is the sixth tier of Swedish football. They play their home matches at the Segeltorps IP in Kungens Kurva.

The club is affiliated to Stockholms Fotbollförbund.

Current squad

Season to season

Footnotes

External links

 Segeltorps IF – Official website
 Segeltorps IF Dam on Facebook

Football clubs in Stockholm
1925 establishments in Sweden